This is a list of singles that reached number one on the Cash Box Top 100 Singles chart in 1983, presented in chronological order.

See also
1983 in music
List of Hot 100 number-one singles of 1983 (U.S.)

References
http://members.aol.com/_ht_a/randypny3/cashbox/1983.html
https://web.archive.org/web/20100305085316/http://cashboxmagazine.com/archives/80s_files/1983.html
https://web.archive.org/web/20060614052149/http://musicseek.info/no1hits/1983.htm

1983
1983 record charts
1983 in American music